Kgotso Moleko (born 27 August 1989) is a South African professional soccer player who last played as a right-back for Amazulu in the South African Premier Division.

References

External links

1989 births
Living people
Sportspeople from Bloemfontein
South African soccer players
South Africa international soccer players
Association football defenders
Bloemfontein Celtic F.C. players
Kaizer Chiefs F.C. players
AmaZulu F.C. players
South African Premier Division players
Soccer players from the Free State (province)